The New England Black Wolves were a professional box lacrosse team based in Uncasville, Connecticut. They were members of the East Division of the National Lacrosse League and began play in the winter of 2014–2015 at the Mohegan Sun Arena in Uncasville. The team was partially owned by the Mohegan Tribe of Indians of Connecticut, partially owned by Ted Goldthorpe, and partially owned by Brad Brewster.

The Black Wolves relocated from Philadelphia, Pennsylvania, where they were known as the Philadelphia Wings from 1987 to 2014 and won 6 championships.

On February 22, 2021, the team was reported to have been sold and was relocated to Albany, New York, to play out of the MVP Arena as the Albany FireWolves.

History
The Black Wolves won their first game at home on January 2, 2015 against the Buffalo Bandits in front of just under 6,000 fans. Kyle Buchanan scored the first ever goal for the Black Wolves in New England's 12-8 win. The team would finish with a record of 4-14 in its inaugural season. With a new coach behind the bench, the Black Wolves would bounce back and have a much improved 2016 season, which led them to a 10-8 record and playoff run that ended to the Bandits in the East Division final. 

The Black Wolves' third year was not as successful as their second, as they fell to a 8-10 record and lost in the East Division semi-final. The Black Wolves continued to struggle in the regular season and playoffs, as in 2018 and 2019 they finished with a 9-9 record and a first round exit in the playoffs in each of those seasons. 

2020 appeared to be a different season for the Black Wolves with the emergence of Doug Jamieson as a legitimate starting goalie and forward Callum Crawford. Having an MVP caliber season, the Black Wolves seemed poised for a deep playoff run and potentially a championship. However, with the onset of the COVID-19 pandemic, the NLL cancelled the rest of the season.

After struggling with attendance at the end of the season, it was announced that the New England Black Wolves franchise would move to Albany and rebrand as the Albany FireWolves. The franchise finished with one main notable achievement as a team and it was being declared the East Division Champions in 2020 after the stoppage of the season.

Final roster

All-time record

Playoff results

Draft history

NLL Entry Draft 
First Round Selections

 2014: Mark Cockerton (4th overall), Quinn Powless (8th overall) 
 2015: Dan Lintner (8th overall)
 2016: Seth Oakes (8th overall)
 2017: Colton Watkinson (7th overall), Anthony Joaquim (8th overall), JP Kealey (10th overall) 
 2018: None 
 2019: Andrew Kew (3rd overall), Zach Goodrich (17th overall) 
 2020: None

Head coaching history
Note: This list does not include head coaches from the Philadelphia Wings.

References

External links
 New England Black Wolves official website
 National Lacrosse League official website

 
Defunct National Lacrosse League teams
Sports in Uncasville, Connecticut
Lacrosse clubs established in 2014
Lacrosse teams in Connecticut
2014 establishments in Connecticut